Belton High School (BHS) is a public high school that serves the city of Belton, Texas, United States, parts of Bell County and classified as a 5A school by the University Interscholastic League (UIL). It is a part of the Belton Independent School District located in south central Bell County. In 2015, the school was rated "Met Standard" by the Texas Education Agency.

Statistics 
BHS's student information according to TEA 2017-18 Campus Performance Report 52.8% White, 33.5 Hispanic, 7.6% African American, 3.3% Two or More Races, 2% Asian, 0.7% American Indian, and 0.2% Pacific Islander.

Athletics
The Belton Tigers compete in these sports - 

Baseball
Basketball
Cross Country
Football
Golf
Powerlifting
Soccer
Softball
Swimming
Tennis
Track and Field
Volleyball

State Titles
Baseball  - 
1994(4A)
Boys Basketball  - 
1958(2A)
Girls Golf - 
1985(4A), 1988(4A)
Boys Track - 
1909(All)
2013 State Champion Individual Golfer, Andrew Paysse
1995-96 UIL 4A State Marching Band Contest Champions
Magic Belles National champions 2016

Rivalry with Temple

Belton's rival is the Temple High School Wildcats. This is most visible during the yearly Belton-Temple football game. The cities of Belton and Temple in the past have shared years of animosity towards each other, possibly from the founding of Temple by the Santa Fe Railroad.

This spilled over onto the football field during the 1920s and 1930s. It was not uncommon for fights to break out between fans in the parking lot after the game. After the 1936 game this almost turned deadly. Several people were taken to the hospital and one was hospitalized with critical injuries. Given that the fights had increased in violence over the last 3 years and commerce between the two cities was starting to suffer a county judge made a decree that the two schools shall not play each other for a minimum of 50 years. The two schools would not meet again on the football field until 1995.

In general the rivalry is friendly in nature today. Custom shirts are usually printed up by both sides to mark the event. Sometimes pranks, small acts of vandalism and general shenanigans occur in the week prior to the game. Most of this is minor in nature and are perpetrated by the students involved in the games.

The first artificially-lighted football game played in the state of Texas was the 1921 Belton-Temple game played at Wildcat Field.

In 2009, the rivalry with Temple was nationally televised on ESPNU at Wildcat Stadium and the Tigers were victorious over Temple for the first time since 2005.

In 2013 the rivalry died in district play after Temple stayed at 5A and Belton moved up to 6A. However the schools do meet in scrimmages in a variety of sports.

In 2016 the rivalry was renewed through a preseason matchup at Tiger Field (Belton, TX). However, the Wildcats won 28-20, bouncing back from a 17-14 score at halftime. The two schools will meet again next year in preseason at Wildcat Stadium.

In 2018 the Tigers faced off against the Wildcats at Wildcat Stadium. After a thrilling 3OT game, the Tigers went home with a devastating 58-55 loss. Both teams have gone on to compete in the 2018 Texas High School State Playoffs.

Stabbing Incident
On the morning of May 3, 2022, an altercation between two students took place in one of the bathrooms on the school's campus.  During this incident, one of the students was stabbed, prompting a lockdown of the school.  The victim died at a local hospital, and the alleged perpetrator fled the scene but was apprehended by Belton police later that day and taken into custody.

Notable alumni
David Ash, former University of Texas football quarterback
George Eads, television actor
Robert Ford, former NFL wide receivers coach
Khiry Robinson, running back for the New Orleans Saints
Booker Russell, former NFL running back.
Ricky Sanders, former NFL wide receiver
Durham Smythe, American football tight end for the Miami Dolphins
Ramonce Taylor, football player
Henry T. Waskow, US Army Captain memorialized by Ernie Pyle
Molly S. White (Class of 1976), Republican member of the Texas House of Representatives from Belton
William Wilbanks, American criminologist, Texas High School Basketball Hall of Fame member
Randy Winkler, former NFL offensive tackle
Rudy Youngblood, actor

References

External links

 Belton Independent School District

High schools in Bell County, Texas
Public high schools in Texas